The George Mason Law Review is an independent law review run by students at the Antonin Scalia Law School of George Mason University. Founded in 1976, and partially re-founded after reorganization in 1995, it is the flagship law review of the Antonin Scalia Law School. The journal usually publishes four or five issues per year, with two of those issues dedicated to annual symposia including the journal's notable annual symposium that focuses on antitrust law.

History 
The Antonin Scalia Law School at George Mason University was formerly the International School of Law, whose student-run publication, the International School of Law Review began in 1976. When the school became George Mason School of Law in 1979, the publication became the George Mason University Law Review. In 1992, the student-run law review briefly split with the law school's administration, publishing as the George Mason Independent Law Review. During this time the George Mason Independent Law Review maintained a traditional law review format by publishing both professional and student works. While another law review under the name George Mason University Law Review only published articles written by the students of the law school. In the Fall of 1995, pursuant to an agreement with the dean of the law school, the two law reviews merged and George Mason Independent Law Review began operating as the modern George Mason Law Review.

Membership 
Like most American law reviews, membership on the law review is granted through a competitive process. First-year students must participate in a Write-On competition after completing their final exams in the spring semester. The Law Review then considers the student's first-year grades and performance in the write on to make offers of membership. Prospective members must be in the top 50 percent of their first year law school class.

George Mason Law Review Annual Symposium on Antitrust 
Each year, the review holds a symposium on antitrust law at the law school's campus in Arlington, Virginia. The symposium consists of a keynote address by a leader in the field of antitrust law followed by panels discussing aspects of antitrust law. Past speakers have included Makan Delrahim, Maureen Ohlhausen, Joshua D. Wright, J. Thomas Rosch, and Neelie Kroes. The Law Review publishes an issue dedicated to the symposium.

Notable articles
Notable articles published in the George Mason Law Review include:
Hausman, J. A., and G. K. Leonard. “Economic Analysis of Differentiated Products Mergers Using Real World Data.” Geo. Mason L. Rev. 5 (1996): 321.
Nelson, R. H. “Privatizing the Neighborhood: A Proposal to Replace Zoning with Private Collective Property Rights to Existing Neighborhoods.” 7 Geo. Mason L. Rev. 827 (1998).
Shapiro, C. “Exclusivity in Network Industries.” 7 Geo. Mason L. Rev. 673 (1998).

References

American law journals
General law journals
George Mason University academic journals
Law journals edited by students
Publications established in 1976